Elland is a town and an unparished area in the metropolitan borough of Calderdale, West Yorkshire, England.  Elland ward contains 47 listed buildings that are recorded in the National Heritage List for England.  Of these, two are listed at Grade I, the highest of the three grades, two are at Grade II*, the middle grade, and the others are at Grade II, the lowest grade.  The ward contains the town of Elland, the hamlet of Blackley, and the surrounding area.  The Calder and Hebble Navigation passes through the area, and the listed buildings associated with this are locks, a bridge, a milepost, a lock keeper's house, a warehouse, and an office.  The other listed buildings include houses and cottages, churches and associated structures, public houses, a barn, a set of stocks, a mill warehouse, four milestones, a former town hall, a former bank, a war memorial, and two telephone kiosks.


Key

Buildings

References

Citations

Sources

Lists of listed buildings in West Yorkshire
Listed buildings